Hibbert is a surname. Its origin can be traced back to the Old Germanic given name Hildeberht, which is composed of German elements hilde (battle or strife) and berht (bright or famous). Today it might be translated to "bright battle".  It was adopted by the Normans, where it became "Hildebert" or "Hilbert".

This specific variation ("Hibbert") was introduced to England after the Conquest of 1066 as a surname rather than a personal name.  The Norman Conquerors imported a vast number of Norman French personal names into England, which largely replaced traditional Old English personal names among the upper and middle classes.  It is a prevailing characteristic for Norman surnames to experience many spelling variations.  Variations include Hibart, Hibbard, Hibbart, Hibberd, Hibbet, Hibbets, Hibbett, Hibbotts, Hubert, Hubbert, Hubbard, and others.  The names Ilbert and Ibbitt share a similar origin.

This surname appears to have been first noted in Cheshire, England, where they held a family seat from very early times.  From England the surname Hibbert further spread to the Dutch, Welsh, and Irish. The first immigrant to the Americas with this surname appears to be Robert Hibbert, who arrived in Salem, Massachusetts, in 1636. The most people with this surname live in the United States where the most individuals with this surname can be found in New York and Pennsylvania. Globally the country with the highest concentration of individuals with this surname (by percent of population, 2014) is Jamaica where 0.13% of the population carries the name and it is ranked number 125.

People with the surname
 Alex Hibbert (born 1986), English polar expedition leader, motivational speaker, author and photographer
 Billy Hibbert (1884–1949), English professional footballer
 Carlton Hibbert, English drummer
 Christopher Hibbert (1924–2008), English writer, historian and biographer
 Curtis Hibbert (born 1966), Canadian stuntman and former gymnast
 Dale Hibbert, English musician (bassist)
 Danny Hibbert (born 1948), former Australian rules footballer
 David Hibbert (born 1986), English football striker
 Edward Hibbert (born 1955), American actor
 Eleanor Hibbert (1906–1993), British novelist
 Fernand Hibbert (1873–1928), Haitian novelist
 George Hibbert (1757–1837), English merchant and politician
 Guy Hibbert (born 1950), American screenwriter
 Sir Henry Hibbert (1850–1927), British Conservative politician
 Hugh Hibbert (1911–1985), English cricketer
 Jack Hibbert (footballer) (1869–unknown), English professional footballer
 Sir Jack Hibbert (1932–2005), British statistician
 James Hibbert (born 1831), English architect
 Sir John Tomlinson Hibbert (1824–1908), British politician
 Joseph Hibbert (1894–unknown), Jamaican Rastafari elder
 Julius Hibbert, fictional character in The Simpsons
 Lennie Hibbert (1928–mid-1980s), Jamaican musician
 Ossie Hibbert (born c.1950), Jamaican organist, keyboard player and record producer
 Paul Hibbert (1952–2008), Australian cricketer
 Sir Reginald Hibbert (1922–2002), British diplomat
 Robert Hibbert (1717-1784), (1717–1784), West Indian merchant and Mancunian cotton manufacturer
 Robert Hibbert (Anti-Trinitarian) (1769–1849), Jamaican merchant and financier, established the Hibbert Lectures
 Robert Hibbert (cricketer) (1812–1833), English cricketer
 Roy Hibbert (born 1986), Jamaican-American professional basketball player
 Thomas Hibbert (1710–1780), slave owner and merchant in Jamaica
 Tony Hibbert (British Army officer) (1917-2014), British soldier and gardener
 Tony Hibbert (musician) (born 1956), English musician (bass guitarist)
 Tony Hibbert (born 1981), English football defender
 Toots Hibbert (1945–2020), Jamaican reggae singer and songwriter

References

See also
 Hilbert (surname)

Surnames from given names